Dom Luís Filipe, Prince Royal of Portugal, Duke of Braganza, (/; 21 March 1887 – 1 February 1908) was the eldest son and heir-apparent of King Carlos I of Portugal. He was born in 1887 when his father was still Prince Royal of Portugal and received the usual style of the heirs to the heir of the Portuguese crown: 4th Prince of Beira at birth, with the subsidiary title 14th Duke of Barcelos. After his grandfather King Luís I of Portugal died, he became Prince Royal of Portugal with the subsidiary titles 21st Duke of Braganza, 20th Marquis of Vila Viçosa, 28th count of Barcelos, 25th count of Ourém, 23rd count of Arraiolos and 22nd count of Neiva.

Early life

Luís Filipe Maria Carlos Amélio Fernando Víctor Manuel António Lourenço Miguel Rafael Gabriel Gonzaga Xavier Francisco de Assis Bento was born in Lisbon, the elder son of Carlos, Prince Royal of Portugal (later King Carlos I of Portugal), and Princess Amélie d'Orléans, a member of the House of Braganza.

Two years after his birth, Dom Luís Filipe inherited all his father's royal princely titles when his father became king. He was himself re-styled Prince Royal, and at the same time inherited the Dukedom of Braganza (as 21st Duke), which brought with it the largest private fortune in Portugal at that time, completely at the disposal of the heir to the Portuguese crown. 

In 1907, the Prince Royal acted as regent of the kingdom while his father was outside the country. The same year he made a very successful official visit to the Portuguese colonies in Africa, the first member of the royal family ever to visit them.

Dom Luís Filipe was the pupil of the African war hero Mouzinho de Albuquerque, and like all the Braganzas, showed many aptitudes in the arts, besides his pursuing a military education. Around the time of Dom Luís Filipe's assassination, negotiations for marriage to his cousin Princess Patricia of Connaught were underway. Princess Patricia was the granddaughter of Queen Victoria of the United Kingdom and Prince Albert of Saxe-Coburg and Gotha, the daughter of British Prince Arthur, Duke of Connaught and Strathearn, and Princess Louise Margaret of Prussia.

Lisbon Regicide

On 1 February 1908, Luís Filipe and his family were returning to Lisbon from Vila Viçosa Palace. Alfredo Luís da Costa and Manuel Buiça, two members of a revolutionary society called the Carbonária, shot at all the royal family, hitting his father King Carlos, Luís Filipe, and his younger brother Infante Manuel, Duke of Beja. Carlos I died immediately, while Luís Filipe lived for another twenty minutes. Manuel survived the attack, having only been shot in the arm, while the queen was unharmed. 

Manuel succeeded to the throne as Manuel II. Luís Filipe is buried next to his father and forefathers in the Royal Pantheon of the House of Braganza in Lisbon. His younger brother, King Manuel II of Portugal, and his mother, Queen Maria Amélia, are buried opposite.

On 5 October 1910, the monarchy under the reign of his surviving younger brother, Manuel II, was overthrown in a military coup and the Portuguese First Republic was established.

Honours

Domestic
 Grand Commander of the Three Military Orders of Christ, Aviz and St. James
 Grand Cross of the Royal Military Order of the Tower and Sword
 Grand Cross of the Royal Military Order of Our Lady of Conception of Vila Vicosa

Foreign
 : Knight of the Order of the Black Eagle
 : Grand Cross of the Order of Saint-Charles, 22 July 1904
 :
 Grand Cross of the Royal and Distinguished Order of Charles III, 1887
 Knight of the Order of the Golden Fleece, 14 November 1892
 : Stranger Knight of the Most Noble Order of the Garter, 15 July 1902
 : Grand Cordon of the Supreme Order of the Chrysanthemum, 10 June 1904

Arms

Luis Filipe bore as heir to the throne the arms of his father; differenced by a Label of three points Or.

Ancestry

References

1887 births
1908 deaths
People from Lisbon
House of Braganza-Saxe-Coburg and Gotha
Dukes of Braganza
Murdered royalty
Assassinated Portuguese people
People murdered in Portugal
Heirs apparent who never acceded
3
3
3
Knights Grand Cross of the Order of the Immaculate Conception of Vila Viçosa
Extra Knights Companion of the Garter
Knights of the Golden Fleece of Spain
Grand Crosses of the Order of Saint-Charles
Deaths by firearm in Portugal
Princes Royal of Portugal
Princes of Beira
Burials at the Monastery of São Vicente de Fora
19th-century Portuguese people
1908 murders in Portugal
Sons of kings